
Gmina Pielgrzymka is a rural gmina (administrative district) in Złotoryja County, Lower Silesian Voivodeship, in south-western Poland.

Neighbouring gminas
Gmina Pielgrzymka is bordered by the gminas of Lwówek Śląski, Świerzawa, Warta Bolesławiecka, Wleń, Zagrodno and Złotoryja.

Villages
The gmina contains the villages of Czaple, Nowa Wieś Grodziska, Nowe Łąki, Pielgrzymka, Proboszczów, Sędzimirów, Twardocice and Wojcieszyn.

References

Pielgrzymka
Złotoryja County